General Henderson may refer to:

Archibald Henderson (1783–1859), U.S. Marine Corps brevet brigadier general; longest-serving Commandant
David Henderson (British Army officer) (1862–1921), British Army lieutenant general
James Pinckney Henderson (1808–1858), Texan Army brigadier general and first Governor of the State of Texas
John Henderson (British Army officer) (fl. 1980s–2010s), British Army major general
John Henderson (Mississippi politician) (1797–1857) Mississippi Militia brigadier general
Robert Johnson Henderson (1822–1891), Confederate States Army brigadier general (promotion disputed)
William Henderson (general) (1919–1995), Australian Army major general

See also
Attorney General Henderson (disambiguation)